The Time Machine is a 1978 American made-for-television science fiction-adventure film produced by Sunn Classic Pictures as a part of their Classics Illustrated series.  The film stars John Beck and Priscilla Barnes, and was broadcast November 5, 1978 during the November Sweeps on NBC.

Synopsis
The film is a modernization of the Wells' story, making the Time Traveller a 1970s scientist working for a fictional US defense contractor, "the Mega Corporation". Dr. Neil Perry (John Beck), the Time Traveller, is described as one of Mega's most reliable contributors by his senior co-worker Branly (Whit Bissell, an alumnus of the 1960 adaptation). Perry's skill is demonstrated by his rapid reprogramming of an off-course satellite, averting a disaster that could have destroyed Los Angeles. His reputation had secured a grant of $20 million for his time machine project. A month from completion, the corporation wants Perry to put his project on hold so that he can begin work on a new weapons project, the "anti-matter bomb." The unexpectedly early completion of the power module that Perry needed to complete the time machine permits him to test his creation the weekend before he is set to begin work on the anti-matter bomb.

Perry time travels twice over the course of the weekend, and reports to Haverson, Branley, and J.R. Worthington (Andrew Duggan), chairman of the board of Mega Corporation. As Neil tells the story of his travels, reversed time-lapse images of building construction demonstrate Neil's passage backwards in time. Unlike the novel, the time machine and its rider do not stay in the same place as they travel through time, and the machine can travel to different locations. Perry first goes to 1692 Salem, Massachusetts where he is caught up in the Salem witch trials and found guilty of witchcraft. He is sentenced to be burned at the stake with his time machine. Tied up in the seat of his machine, he is able to free himself in order to escape. He detours into 1871 to avoid a time warp and arrives in the midst of the California Gold Rush, where he is shot at by miners who thinks that he is trying to steal their gold shipment and is arrested. Perry's ingenuity and the distraction of a bank robbery allow him to escape.

When Perry returns to his lab in the present, he receives a chilling report of the environmental impact of Mega Corporation's latest weapons. Perry then travels into the future to supply proof for the report's projections and convince Haverson that Mega's current agenda will lead to global devastation.  Neil witnesses the fiery destruction of civilization, but also the re-emergence of nature from the wasteland. During the devastation humanity retreated underground. Eventually some decided to return to the surface. Those who did so became the Eloi. Those who remained underground became the Morlocks. The Morlocks have just begun to "harvest" the Eloi for food when Perry arrives on the scene (the year is not made specific). He is befriended by Weena (Priscilla Barnes), who explains how the Eloi-Morlock world came to be. A special museum of technology, showcasing weapons from Perry's era, includes Perry's name on a card identifying a weapon he designed.  A video and audio presentation in the museum reveals that Perry's new assignment at Mega Corporation will be directly responsible for the world's destruction. Before he returns to his own time, Perry and Ariel, the male Eloi, use plastic explosives found in the museum to seal off the Morlocks' three entrances to the Eloi habitat.

Perry gives his report to Haverson and Washington, and discovers they are uninterested in saving the world from destruction.  Instead, they are interested in using the time machine to gain a military advantage over other world powers. Perry leaves them and returns to Weena and the Eloi, who are now free of the Morlocks.

Cast
 John Beck as Dr. Neil Perry
 Whit Bissell as Ralph Branly
 Priscilla Barnes as Weena
 R. G. Armstrong as Gen. Harris
 John Zaremba as the Secretary of Defense
 Andrew Duggan as Mega Board Chairman J.R. Washington (pronounced "Worthington")
 Rosemary DeCamp as Neil Perry's secretary Agnes
 Jack Kruschen as John Bedford
 John Hansen as Ariel
 John Doucette as Sheriff Finley
 Nick Steury as Dark Morlock
 Parley Baer as Henry Haverson
 Bill Zuckert as Charlie

Critical response
Film critic David Sindelar defends the film against the accusation that it departs entirely from the novel. He states that the film's anti-war message was done better and more subtly by the George Pal film. Sindelar pokes fun at Perry's adventures in colonial America and the California Gold Rush and feels the Eloi appear and act too much like contemporary American young people.

Shooting locations
The Collier & Heins Financial Consultants building complex in Salt Lake City, Utah was used for some of the modern era scenes. James Collier was president of the company in the late 1970s, and his office was used as Haverson's office. The Morlock scenes were shot in Park City, Utah, in and around one of the mines. Parts of the film were also shot in Kamas, Utah.

References

External links
 
 
 

1978 television films
1978 films
1970s science fiction adventure films
American science fiction adventure films
Films about time travel
Films based on science fiction novels
Films based on British novels
Films based on works by H. G. Wells
Films set in the 1690s
Films set in 1855
Films set in 1871
Films set in 1978
Films set in the future
Films set in Los Angeles
Films set in Massachusetts
Films set in the United States
Films shot in Utah
NBC network original films
The Time Machine
Films about the California Gold Rush
Salem witch trials in fiction
1970s English-language films
Films directed by Henning Schellerup
1970s American films